The 1966 International Cross Country Championships was held in Rabat, Morocco, at the Souissi Racecourse on March 20, 1966.   A report on the event was given in the Glasgow Herald.

Complete results for men, junior men, medallists, 
 and the results of British athletes were published.

Medallists

Individual Race Results

Men's (7.5 mi / 12.1 km)

Junior Men's (4.35 mi / 7.0 km)

Team Results

Men's

Junior Men's

Participation
An unofficial count yields the participation of 134 athletes from 15 countries.

 (4)
 (14)
 (14)
 (9)
 (7)
 (6)
 (12)
 (14)
 (3)
 (11)
 (7)
 (12)
 (8)
 (7)
 (6)

See also
 1966 in athletics (track and field)

References

International Cross Country Championships
International Cross Country Championships
International Cross Country Championships
International Cross Country Championships
Sport in Rabat
20th century in Rabat
Cross country running in Morocco